Herder Herberto Vázquez Corredor (born 20 June 1967) is a Colombian long-distance runner. He competed in the men's 5000 metres at the 1992 Summer Olympics, and was eliminated prior to the final.

References

1967 births
Living people
Athletes (track and field) at the 1992 Summer Olympics
Athletes (track and field) at the 1996 Summer Olympics
Colombian male long-distance runners
Olympic athletes of Colombia
Place of birth missing (living people)
20th-century Colombian people